This page provides the summaries of the matches of the qualifying rounds for the Football at the 1988 Summer Olympics to be held in Seoul. Three countries qualified.

Preliminary round

|}

First round

|}

Second round

|}

Third round

|}

Nigeria, Tunisia and Zambia qualified.

External links 
Games of the XXIV. Olympiad - African Football Qualifying Tournament (Seoul, South Korea, 1988) - Rec.Sport.Soccer Statistics Foundation

Football qualification for the 1988 Summer Olympics
Football at the Summer Olympics – Men's African Qualifiers